Justice Granger may refer to:

Charles T. Granger, associate justice of the Iowa Supreme Court
Miles T. Granger, judge of the Supreme Court of Errors (now the Supreme Court of Connecticut)